Louis Gabrillargues (16 June 1914 – 30 November 1994) was a French footballer.  He was born in Montpellier.

References

External links
 
 
 

1914 births
1994 deaths
French footballers
France international footballers
Ligue 1 players
FC Sète 34 players
FC Sochaux-Montbéliard players
Nîmes Olympique players
Excelsior AC (France) players
1934 FIFA World Cup players
French football managers
Nîmes Olympique managers
SR Colmar players
Association football midfielders